Mesidionematidae is a family of nematodes belonging to the order Spirurida.

Genera:
 Mesidionema Poinar, 1978

References

Spirurida